Davide Massaro (born 10 February 1998) is an Italian professional footballer who plays as a forward.

Club career
Born in Bassano del Grappa, a town in the Province of Vicenza, Veneto region, Massaro started his career at Vicenza Calcio. On 30 January 2015 Massaro was signed by Serie A club Juventus for €630,000 transfer fee. Massaro signed a -year contract. However, the Old Lady also loaned Massaro back to Vicenza for their youth and reserve teams until 30 June 2016. Vicenza even had an option to buy back Massaro. Massaro scored against Juventus in the second half of 2014–15 season, for Vicenza's under-17 team.

On 26 August 2016 Massaro and Juventus team-mate Nazzareno Belfasti were signed by Lega Pro club Carrarese. Massaro was assigned number 24 shirt of the first team. He started playing first for their reserves. However, on 17 December 2016, Massaro made his professional debut against Lupa Roma, substituting Roberto Floriano in the 85th minute.

After a season spent at SP Tre Fiori, Massaro signed in the summer of 2019 a contract with Romanian Liga II side CS Mioveni.

Honours
Tre Fiori
Coppa Titano: 2018–19

References

External links
 

1998 births
Living people
People from Bassano del Grappa
Footballers from Veneto
Italian footballers
Association football forwards
L.R. Vicenza players
Serie A players
Juventus F.C. players
Serie C players
Carrarese Calcio players
S.P. Tre Fiori players
Liga I players
Liga II players
CS Mioveni players
LPS HD Clinceni players
Italian expatriate footballers
Expatriate footballers in San Marino
Italian expatriate sportspeople in Romania
Expatriate footballers in Romania
Sportspeople from the Province of Vicenza